Anthony Michael Georgiou (born 10 August 1995) is a professional footballer who plays as a midfielder for Leyton Orient. Born in England, he represents Cyprus at international level.

Club career

Tottenham Hotspur
Georgiou made his professional debut for Tottenham in a 3–0 UEFA Champions League victory over Cypriot champions APOEL on 26 September 2017.

In the January 2019 transfer window Georgiou went out on loan to Spanish club Levante.

On 19 August 2019, Georgiou signed a new contract with Tottenham until 2021.

Following the signing of a new contract with Tottenham Georgiou joined League One club Ipswich Town on loan on 19 August until January 2020. He made his League One debut the next day against AFC Wimbledon at Portman Road, starting in the second half as a substitute and helping the team to a 2–1 win. His loan was ended on 28 December, having made 13 appearances in all competitions but without making a league start during his loan spell.

On 31 January 2020, Georgiou joined another League One club, Bolton Wanderers on another six-month loan. Because of injury his debut didn't come until 7 March, where he came on as a substitute in the second half against AFC Wimbledon in a 0–0 draw. He played one more match, also as a substitute, before the COVID-19 pandemic ended the season three months early.

AEL Limassol
In January 2021 Georgiou joined AEL Limassol in the Cypriot First Division in a permanent transfer from Tottenham.

Leyton Orient
Georgiou signed a one-year contract for Leyton Orient on 30 June 2022.

On 7 November 2022, Georgiou signed for National League side Yeovil Town on a short-term loan deal.

International career
Georgiou was born in England and is of Greek Cypriot descent. He played youth international football for Cyprus and made his debut for the senior Cyprus national football team on 23 March 2018 in a friendly match with Montenegro that finished goalless.

Career statistics

Club

International

References

External links
Kicker Profile

1997 births
Living people
People from the London Borough of Lewisham
Cypriot footballers
Cyprus international footballers
Cyprus youth international footballers
English footballers
English people of Greek Cypriot descent
Tottenham Hotspur F.C. players
Levante UD footballers
Ipswich Town F.C. players
Bolton Wanderers F.C. players
AEL Limassol players
Association football midfielders
English Football League players
Leyton Orient F.C. players
Yeovil Town F.C. players
Cypriot First Division players
English expatriate footballers
Expatriate footballers in Spain
Segunda División B players
National League (English football) players